Ciudad Altamirano, is a Mexican city of the state of Guerrero and serves as the municipal seat for Pungarabato. It is part of the Tierra Caliente region of said entity.

The 2010 population was reported to be 37,035 by the Congress of Guerrero.

The city's name honours Ignacio Manuel Altamirano, a 19th-century president of the Supreme Court and writer born in Tixtla, Guerrero.

Altamirano has a paved airport named Santa Barbara Regional Airport. The name comes from the sister town next to Altamirano. Most (if not all) people refer to it as simply Altamirano Airport, or "Aeropuerto Altamirano". The airport does not have any airline services, so the only ones using it are locals who own airplanes. Recently, a small military base was located at the airport.

The Centro de Bachillerato Tecnológico Agropecuario No. 18, a high school, is located in Ciudad Altamirano.

References 

Populated places in Guerrero